Parasymmetrorbione is a genus of isopod containing a single species, Parasymmetrorbione bicauda.

Etymology
The name of the genus was chosen because of its apparent close relationship with the Asymmetrorbione genus.

Distribution
P. bicauda inhabits the waters of the South China Sea.

Description
Like most Bopyridae species, the female is quite larger than its male counterpart. The females measure 11.57mm long; 9.67mm wide. The males have been recorded to be 4.1 mm long; 1.61 mm wide.

Parasitism
Like all species of the subfamily Orbioninae, P. bicauda parasitize the branchials of penaeid shrimp. P. bicauda has been found to infest two species of Solenocera: Solenocera comata and Solenocera alticarinata.

References

Cymothoida
Monotypic arthropod genera